Yu-2 or Yu 2 may refer to:

Yu-2 torpedo, a Chinese-built torpedo
, an Imperial Japanese Army transport submarine of World War II